Michel-Henri St-Louis  is a Canadian Forces officer who holds the rank of major general in the Canadian Army. St-Louis was the acting Commander of the Canadian Army and Chief of the Army Staff in 2021.

Background 
St-Louis served as an infantry officer from the Royal 22e Régiment since 1992. He has deployed on missions to Bosnia, Croatia, Afghanistan and the Middle East, and served as Deputy Commanding General for Operations of the U.S. Army's I Corps at Joint Base Lewis-McChord, and as Commander of Joint Task Force Impact. He holds three master's degrees focused on war, defence and strategy has also served as Commander of the Canadian Army Doctrine and Training Centre since August 2020.

Commander of the Canadian Army 
St-Louis succeeded Major General Derek A. Macaulay as acting Commander of the Canadian Army on April 19, 2021. He assumed the position in an interim capacity while Lieutenant General Wayne Erye acts as Chief of the Defence Staff. St-Louise was subsequently succededed by Lieutenant General Jocelyn Paul.

Military Attaché 
On July 13, 2022, St-Louis was appointed to serve as the Military Attaché to the United States, succeeding Captain William Quinn.

References 

Canadian generals
Canadian military personnel of the War in Afghanistan (2001–2021)
Living people
Recipients of the Meritorious Service Decoration
Year of birth missing (living people)
Royal 22nd Regiment officers